Denise Brown may refer to:

 Denise Brown (athlete) (born 1955), British athlete
 Denise Brown (UN official) (born 1963), Canadian official with the UN World Food Programme
 Denise Scott Brown (born 1931), American architect